Shark is an American legal drama television series created by Ian Biederman that originally aired on CBS from September 21, 2006 to May 20, 2008. The series stars James Woods. On May 10, 2008, CBS cancelled the series after two seasons.

Synopsis
The show revolves around Sebastian Stark (Woods), a notorious Los Angeles defense attorney who becomes disillusioned with his career after his successful defense of a wife-abuser results in the wife's death; after more than a month trying to come to grips with his situation, he is invited by the Los Angeles district attorney to become a public prosecutor so he can apply his unorthodox-but-effective talents to putting guilty people away instead of putting them back on the street. Stark's relationship with the Los Angeles District Attorney's office, his staff, and his daughter, forms the central plot for the series.

Cast and characters

Main
 James Woods as Deputy DA Sebastian Stark, the protagonist of the series and head of the mayor's special unit. At the beginning he is not satisfied with his new job and does not get along well with his team; but he gets used to the new circumstances relatively quickly and is also almost unbeatable as a public prosecutor.
 Jeri Ryan as Jessica Devlin, the district attorney, and Stark's supervisor, in the show's first season. Initially, she is opposed to Stark as a prosecutor; but over time she comes to terms with him and works reasonably well with him. Still, she does not always agree with Stark's methods. In the second season, after her failed reelection, she is a deputy DA and member of Stark's team.
 Danielle Panabaker as Julie Stark, Sebastian Stark's daughter. Because her parents divorced, she moves in with her father in the first episode as she decided to stay with him after her custody hearing, because "he needs her more than he'll ever know." Her mother went to New York City with her new partner.
 Sarah Carter as Deputy DA Madeleine Poe, a prosecutor who in the first episode she joins Stark's special unit voluntarily to learn from him. She had the highest conviction rate of the entire DA's office in the last two years prior to the show's start, and is arguably the best lawyer of Stark's original team. She and Casey sleep together regularly, which does not burden or complicate the work.
 Sophina Brown as Deputy DA Raina Troy, a prosecutor. Troy is passionate, smart and tough, and described by Stark as "brilliant" but "a contempt citation waiting to happen." Midway through the first season she begins a relationship with Stark's investigator Isaac Wright.
 Samuel Page as Deputy DA Casey Woodland (season 1) is a prosecutor after his father and senator gave him this post. Only Jessica Devlin knows about it and blackmails him in the third episode so he has to provide her with information about Stark's contacts. A young, handsome lawyer from an influential family, Casey finds himself having to prove his worth to those who think he bought his way into the job. He begins a sexual relationship with Madeline Poe in spite of their disdain for each other. He leaves the team at the end of the first season to devote himself to his father's election campaign.
 Alexis Cruz as Deputy DA Martin Allende (season 1) is a prosecutor. In eleventh episode, he rescues a girl in a shootout, but gets shot and dies in the hospital.
 Henry Simmons as DA Investigator Isaac Wright (guest in the second episode); main, from the eighth episode of season 1) is a former police officer who was dismissed for false testimony. He takes Stark's offer to work for him as an investigator only after much hesitation. Over time, he establishes a relationship with Raina.
 Kevin Alejandro as Deputy DA Danny Reyes (season 2) is a prosecutor. He joins the team in the first episode of the second season. Previously, he worked in the Department of Organized Crime in L.A., where he worked primarily with Eastern European gangs. He had the highest conviction rate among his peers in his six-year career. At first he dislikes Stark, but he quickly learns to appreciate him because he can work well with him over the law.

Recurring
 Carlos Gómez as Manuel "Manny" Delgado is the acting mayor. In the first episode, he persuades Stark to change to the prosecutor. Nevertheless, he sometimes opposes him to enforce his own interests.
 Billy Campbell as Wayne Robert Callison, a ruthless serial killer, creative writing teacher and Stark's personal nemesis throughout season 1. He targeted emotionally damaged women in their 20s and tortured them to death by cutting them. After he is acquitted, Stark becomes obsessed with putting him behind bars.
 Shaun Sipos as Trevor Boyd (season 2), Julie's boyfriend
 Kevin Pollak as Leo Cutler (season 2), the new district attorney and thus Stark's superior. He won the elections against Jessica Devlin and has since held her post. Stark and he dislike each other from the beginning—Stark considers him an "incompetent ass crawler" in his own words.
 Paula Marshall as Jordan Westlake (season 2), a young and driven state prosecutor who helps Stark when Jessica has to leave town to help her ill father.

Shark's rules
Trial is War. Second place is death.
Truth is relative. Pick one that works.
In a jury trial, there are only 12 opinions that matter and yours (speaking to his team) is not one of them.

Broadcast history
The show first aired in the 10:00 p.m., Eastern Thursday night slot. On October 20, 2006, it was announced that CBS had picked up the show for a full 22-episode season.
CBS announced on May 16, 2007 that Shark would return for a second season to consist of 18 episodes, but due to the writer's strike, it was shortened to 16 episodes.

In Shark's second season, it moved to Sunday night at 10:00 p.m., switching time slots with Without a Trace and thereby competing against another highly rated series, ABC's Brothers & Sisters. In Canada, Global had also picked up Brothers & Sisters, so they decided to keep Shark on Thursday 10 p.m. time slot, three days ahead of the CBS broadcast (except for the Season 2 premiere), and Brothers & Sisters for their Sunday night 10 p.m. time slot.

The show returned Tuesday April 29, 2008 in a new time slot at 9:00 p.m. to air the four remaining post-strike episodes. CBS officially cancelled the series on May 13, 2008.

Filming locations
Shark was filmed mostly in and around Hollywood and Los Angeles in California. Many Hollywood landmarks can be seen including Hollywood Boulevard and the Hollywood Hills. There were roof top scenes shot at the Hollywood Roosevelt Hotel, and exterior and interior shots at the Vibe Hotel, both located on Hollywood Boulevard.

Ratings

Home media

Syndication
Shark began airing on Ion in early 2010, in a Sunday 10 pm to midnight slot, but was soon removed.

International airings
In Australia Shark started airing season 2 at 10 p.m. on Thursdays from November 12, 2009, on Seven's new digital channel 7TWO. Season 2 and the series overall completed its first run airing on W on Friday, December 18.

In the United Kingdom, Shark was shown at 11 a.m. every weekday on Channel 5.

Episodes

Season 1 (2006–07)

Season 2 (2007–08)

References

External links
 

2000s American workplace drama television series
2006 American television series debuts
2008 American television series endings
2000s American legal television series
CBS original programming
English-language television shows
Television series by 20th Century Fox Television
Television shows set in Los Angeles
Television series by Imagine Entertainment
Television series about prosecutors